Julius Stern (March 22, 1886 – April 26, 1977) was an American film producer.  He produced 541 films between 1917 and 1929.  He was a co-founder of Universal Studios. He was born in Hintersteinau, Germany, and died in New York City, New York.  He was the brother of producer Abe Stern and the brother-in-law of Universal Studios co-founder Carl Laemmle.

Biography
Stern arrived in the United States in 1903  and soon thereafter worked with Carl Laemmle at Continental Clothing (which was owned by Julius' uncle Salomon "Sam" Stern). After Laemmle left Continental in 1905, Julius went to work for Laemmle as an Assistant Manager (1906), then as a Manager (1908) of Laemmle's White Front Theater (1908) and was named Carl Laemmle's personal assistant. As such, he was instrumental in the founding and operation of the Laemmle Film Exchange and the Independent Moving Picture Company (IMP), where he was General Manager, until the founding of Universal.  Stern was integral to Laemmle's acquisition of control at Universal. Julius was briefly a Director (1912). and an officer (1912-1929) of Universal Studios and President of L-KO Studios (1916-1919). and Century Comedies (1917-1926), which released under Universal.

Many silent film stars were “discovered” by Julius and his brother Abe, who served as General Manager, under L-KO, Century and Rainbow, including Baby Peggy.   Under Julius’ leadership, Century Comedies and later Stern Brothers often featured animals in comedic roles including “Brownie”, a dog, several lions and “Joe Martin” an orangutan.  In 1926, Century Comedies was dissolved and Stern Brothers Comedy was founded. Stern Brothers continued to release under Universal until 1929 and introduced the world to film series featuring Tarzan, Buster Brown, Mike and Ike and Baby Snookums. In 1929, the Sterns’ relationship with Universal was abruptly discontinued with a telegram from Carl Laemmle and by April 1929 Stern Brothers was laying plans to produce sound feature films as well as continuing their comedy shorts and series at their newly formed National Sound Recording Studio.  In 1933, Max and Arthur Alexander, nephews of Julius and Abe Stern, who had been operating National Studios, renamed the operation Alexander Brothers Studio and commenced production.

Selected filmography
 Whose Zoo? (1918)
 Business Before Honesty (1918)
 Hello Trouble (1918)
 Painless Love (1918)
 The King of the Kitchen ([1918)
 Hop, the Bellhop (1919)
 The Freckled Fish (1919)
 Lions and Ladies (1919)
 Hearts in Hock (1919)
 Laughing Gas (1920)

References

External links

1886 births
1977 deaths
American film producers
German emigrants to the United States